The 2018 Meistriliiga (known as A. Le Coq Premium Liiga for sponsorship reasons) was the 28th season of the Meistriliiga, the highest division of Estonian football system. The season was scheduled to begin on 25 February 2018, but was postponed due to a cold wave. On 3 March, the season began with four out of five second round matches held in indoor arena. This marked the first time Estonian league football was played indoor. The season concluded on 10 November 2018. Flora were the defending champions. Nõmme Kalju won their 2nd Meistriliiga title completing an entire season undefeated.

Teams
10 teams competed in the league. Sillamäe Kalev lost their Meistriliiga license due to a failure to meet their financial obligations and were relegated to the II liiga. On 4 November 2017, it was announced that FCI Tallinn would merge with Levadia.

The two clubs were replaced by 2017 Esiliiga champions Maardu Linnameeskond and runners-up Tallinna Kalev. On 18 December 2017, Kuressaare replaced Maardu Linnameeskond after the latter withdrew from the league due to financial reasons.

Venues

Personnel and kits

Managerial changes

League table

Relegation play-offs
At season's end Kuressaare, the ninth place club, participated in a two-legged play-off with the runners-up (of independent teams) of the 2018 Esiliiga, Elva, for the spot in 2019 Meistriliiga.

Kuressaare won 2–0 on aggregate and retained their Meistriliiga spot for the 2019 season.

Results
Each team played every opponent four times, twice at home and twice away. A total of 180 matches has been played, with 36 matches played by each team.

First half of season

Second half of season

Season statistics

Top scorers

Top assists

Hat-tricks

4 Player scored 4 goals

Awards

Monthly awards

Meistriliiga Player of the Year
Zakaria Beglarishvili was named Meistriliiga Player of the Year.

Goal of the Year
Tõnis Vihmoja's goal against Paide Linnameeskond was chosen Goal of the Year.

Player transfers
 Winter 2017–18 – before the season
 Summer 2018 – during the season

See also
 2017–18 Estonian Cup
 2018–19 Estonian Cup
 2018 Esiliiga
 2018 Esiliiga B

References

External links
Official website

 

Meistriliiga seasons
1
Estonia
Estonia